NBC 26 may refer to the following television stations in the United States:

 WGBA-TV, Green Bay, Wisconsin
 WAGT-CD, Augusta, Georgia